XHMTS-FM is a radio station in Tampico, Tamaulipas, Mexico. It is an owned and operated station of Radio Fórmula, broadcasting on 103.9 MHz.

History
Despite having been made available for commercial use on 1590 kHz from Ciudad Madero in 1976, XEMTS-AM 780 received its concession on April 18, 1986. XEMTS was owned by Radio de Teponaztli de Tampico, S.A. de C.V. and broadcast with 1,000 watts day and 250 at night. Radio Fórmula bought XEMTS in 2000 and converted it to FM in 2011.

On March 3, 2019, an operating agreement with Grupo GAPE Radio ended, and with it, the use of the "Fórmula NotiGAPE" name.

References

Spanish-language radio stations
Radio stations in Tampico
Radio Fórmula